This is a list of notable politicians in the Republic of Turkey.


A
 Meral Akşener - vice speaker of parliament
 Yıldırım Akbulut - prime minister
 İsmail Rüştü Aksal - CHP secretary general
 Ekrem Alican- YTP leader
 Oya Araslı- politician (CHP)
 Hamdi Apaydın - First term MP
 Saffet Arıkan - Government minister
 Mustafa Kemal Atatürk - Founder and first President of the Turkish Republic
 Mehmet Ali Aybar - leader of TİP

B 
 Ali Babacan – vice prime minister
 Devlet Bahçeli - leader of MHP - vice prime minister
 Cemil Sait Barlas - Government minister
 Faik Ahmet Barutçu - Government minister
 Celal Bayar - president - leader of DP
 Deniz Baykal – leader CHP
 Hikmet Bayur - Government minister
 Behice Boran - leader of TİP
 Ferruh Bozbeyli - Parliament speaker
 Mahmut Esat Bozkurt - Government minister
 Osman Bölükbaşı -leader of MP

C 
 Necdet Calp -leader of HP
 İsmail Cem - leader of YTP, foreign minister

Ç 
 İhsan Sabri Çağlayangil - senate chairman, acting president
 Fevzi Çakmak – leader of MP
 Hikmet Çetin - leader of CHP
 Vasıf Çınar - Government minister
 Hatı Çırpan - first female villager parliament member
 Tansu Çiller - leader of DYP, female prime minister

D 
 Süleyman Demirel - leader of AP, leader of DYP, prime minister, president
 Ali Dinçer - mayor of Ankara, deputy chairman of the assembly

E 
 Bülent Ecevit - leader of DSP, prime minister
 Rahşan Ecevit -leader of DSP
 Necmettin Erbakan, prime minister
 Recep Tayyip Erdoğan - leader of AK Party, prime minister, president
 Nihat Erim - prime minister
 Kenan Evren - president

F
 Turhan Feyzioğlu- leader of CGP

G 
 Reşit Galip - Minister of National Education
 Mübeccel Göktuna -leader of the first women's party
 Şemsettin Günaltay-prime minister
 Abdullah Gül - prime minister, president
 Kasım Gülek -secretary general of CHP
 Birgül Ayman Güler- vice president of CHP
 Cemal Gürsel- president and prime minister
 Gencay Gürün - MP, dramatist, diplomat
 Kemal Güven - parliament speaker
 Aydın Güven Gürkan - leader of HP, SHP

I 
 Sadi Irmak - prime minister

İ 
 Tevfik İleri - Government minister
 Müfide İlhan  - first female mayor (Mersin)
 Erdal İnönü –  leader of SODEP, SHP, vice prime minister
 İsmet İnönü - leader of CHP, prime minister, president

K 

 Atilla Karaosmanoğlu
 Murat Karayalçın -leader of SHP
 Cahit Karakaş - Parliament speaker
 Cezmi Kartay - leader of SODEP
 Kemal Kılıçdaroğlu - leader of CHP
 Refik Koraltan - chairman of the parliament
 Fahri Korutürk - president
 Sadık Kutlay - minister of settlement

M 
 Ferit Melen - prime minister
 Adnan Menderes - prime minister
 Hüseyin Numan Menemencioğlu -Government minister
 Güldal Mumcu - Parliament vice speaker

N 
 Mustafa Necati (Uğural) - Three times government minister
 Fatma Esma Nayman - one of the earliest female MPs

O 
Ali Fethi Okyar - prime minister
Rauf Orbay - chairman of the government - opposition leader (in early parliament)

Ö 
 Huriye Öniz - one of the first female MPs 
 Turgut Özal - leader of ANAP; prime minister, president
 Fahrettin Özdilek - vice prime minister
 Altan Öymen - leader of CHP

P 
Recep Peker - prime minister

S 
 Hasan Saka - prime minister
 Şükrü Saracoğlu- prime minister
 Kemal Satır -secretary general of CHP
 Refik Saydam- prime minister
 Gün Sazak - government minister
 Nur Serter - CHP MP
 Ahmet Necdet Sezer - president 
 Zeki Sezer - leader of DSP
 Fuat Sirmen -Parliament speaker
 Cevdet Sunay - president
 Faruk Sükan - Government minister

T 
 Naim Talu - prime minister
 Ali Rana Tarhan - Government minister
 Emine Ülker Tarhan - group chair women of CHP
 Yusuf Kemal Tengirşenk - Government minister
 Alparslan Türkeş – leader of MHP
 Ahmet Fikri Tüzer - acting prime minister

U 
Necdet Uğur - Government minister
Bülent Ulusu - prime minister
Hilmi Uran - Government minister
Behçet Uz - Government minister

Ü
 Gülkız Ürbül - first female villagehead
 Suat Hayri Ürgüplü - prime minister
 Mustafa Üstündağ - Government minister
 Besim Üstünel -Government minister

Y 
 Dilek Akagün Yılmaz - CHP MP
 Mesut Yılmaz - leader of ANAP, prime minister
 Lebit Yurdoğlu - minister of Settlement

Turkish politicians serving in other countries
 Lale Akgün - German politician
 Nebahat Albayrak - Dutch politician
 Osman "Oz" Bengür, Maryland Democratic Party Congressional Candidate
 Sevim Dağdelen - German politician
 Ekin Deligöz - German politician
 Rauf Denktaş - Politician, Former President of the Turkish Republic of Northern Cyprus
 Ahmed Djemal - Politician, Member of the Young Turks
 Ahmed Doğan - Human rights activist and politician, leader of Movement for Rights and Freedoms.
 Fatma Ekenoğlu - Politician
 John Eren, politician brother of Tayfun Eren.
 Tayfun Eren, Politician, He was the first person of Turkish birth to be elected to a Parliament in Australia
 Hakkı Keskin - German politician
 Fazıl Küçük - Politician, Vice President of Cyprus
 Vural Öger - German politician
 Cem Özdemir - German Politician
 Ferdi Sabit Soyer – Politician
 Mehmet Ali Talat - Politician, President of the Turkish Republic of Northern Cyprus
 Zeki Velidi Togan - Politician, Historian
 Emel Etem Toshkova - Bulgarian politician, Deputy Prime Minister of Bulgaria (current)
 Ziya Gökalp - Politician, Poet
 Fatin Rüştü Zorlu - Politician, Diplomat, Minister of Foreign Affairs of Turkey

References

Turkish
Politicians
List
Politicians